The 1800 English cricket season was the 29th in which matches have been awarded retrospective first-class cricket status and the 14th after the foundation of the Marylebone Cricket Club. The season saw five top-class matches played in the country.

Matches 
Just five top-class matches were played during the season, three of them featuring Surrey sides. All five matches were played at Lord's Old Ground.

Debutants
Players who made their first-class cricket debuts in 1800 included:

References

Further reading
 Altham HS (1962) A History of Cricket, Volume 1 London: George Allen & Unwin.
 Birley D (1999)  A Social History of English Cricket. London: Aurum. 
 Major J (2007) More Than a Game: The Story of Cricket's Early Years. London: HarperCollins. 

1800 in English cricket
English cricket seasons in the 18th century